Sis Rural District is a rural district (dehestan) in Bolbanabad District, Dehgolan County, Kurdistan Province, Iran. At the 2006 census, its population was 6,627, in 1,558 families. The rural district has 15 villages.

References 

Rural Districts of Kurdistan Province
Dehgolan County